were a Japanese vocal group consisting of twin sisters Emi (Itō Emi) and Yumi Itō (Itō Yumi). They were born in Nagoya, Japan in April, 1 1941. As identical twins they had voices only slightly apart in timbre, which resulted in their singing together sounding like a solo artist utilizing double tracking or reverb.

Career
While still in high school, the twins were discovered by a talent scout while performing at a night club. They were brought to Tokyo where they became the first clients for Watanabe Productions. In 1959, the Peanuts became a hit at the Nichigeki theater. That same year, they released their first recording, Kawaii Hana ("Cute Flower"). In their early years they sang Japanese covers of standards, foreign hits, and Japanese folk songs; then they began singing originals, written by their producer, Hiroshi Miyagawa, and such songwriters as Koichi Sugiyama and Rei Nakanishi. They were the first to perform "Koi no Vacance". 

The twins embarked on a brief acting career appearing as Mothra's twin fairies, known as the Shobijin, in the 1961 film Mothra, and the 1964 films Mothra vs. Godzilla and Ghidorah, the Three-Headed Monster. In the audio commentary for the DVD of Mothra vs. Godzilla, it is noted that director Ishirō Honda recalled the Itos' professionalism. Though not primarily actresses, the twins were surprisingly skilled, learned their lines without trouble, and always worked on time, despite their busy schedule.

Emi had a mole near her left eye. To preserve their image as identical, Yumi would have a mole drawn near her left eye.

Foreign performances
They appeared in the United States on The Ed Sullivan Show on April 3, 1966, performing "Lover Come Back to Me".

Unusual for Japanese singers at the time, the duo had success in Germany, as well as in Austria. In 1963 Caterina Valente was in Japan where the duo caught her attention. Valente invited them to Germany. On the occasion of the 1964 Summer Olympics in Tokyo, Michael Pfleghar produced the opening ceremonies, where both were also invited, and the musical director Heinz Kiessling produced German-language recordings with them, including "Souvenirs from Tokyo". In 1965, Pfleghar cast them in two other shows "The Smile in the West" and "Schlager-Festspiele". In total, they released eight singles in the German language between 1964 and 1967. In 1965 "Souvenirs from Tokyo" reached No. 18 on the Austrian charts and spent 2 weeks at No. 40 on the German Billboard charts. In 1967 "Bye, Bye Yokohama" spent 4 weeks on the Germany charts, rising to No. 30. In 1966, the duo also performed at the Olympia in Paris.

Retirement and death
The pair retired from performing in 1975 after Emi married fellow Nabepro star Kenji Sawada. The duo is remembered most for its versions of European songs and for a handful of Japanese pop songs, such as "Furimukanaide" ("Don't Turn Around"). 

Emi Itō died on June 15, 2012, at the age of 71. Yumi died on May 18, 2016, at the age of 75.

Discography
可愛いピーナッツ (Cute Peanuts) (1959)
ピーナッツ民謡お国めぐり (Peanut Folk Song Country Tour) (1960)
ヒットパレード (The Hit Parade) (1960)
夢で会いましょう (I'll See You in My Dreams) (1961)
ヒットパレード第2巻 (The Hit Parade Vol. 2) (1962)
ヒットパレード第3巻 (The Hit Parade Vol. 3) (1962)
フォークソング (The Folk Songs) (1963)
人気の基準 (Popular Standards) (1963
ヒットパレード (The Hit Parade) (1963)
ヒットパレード第4巻 (The Hit Parade Vol. 4) (1964)
ヒットパレード第5巻 (The Hit Parade Vol. 5) (1964)
ヒットパレード第6巻 (The Hit Parade Vol. 6) (1965)
Souvenirs aus Tokio (1965)
ヒットパレード第6巻 – ヨーロッパ周辺 (The Hit Parade Vol. 6 – Around Europe) (1966)
ザ・ピーナッツ・デラックス (The Peanuts Deluxe) (1967)
ゴールデンデラックス (Golden Deluxe) (1968)
フィーリング・グッド – ピーナッツの新しい次元 (Feelin' Good – New Dimension of the Peanuts) (1970)
ザ・ピーナッツ・ダブル・デラックス (The Peanuts Double Deluxe) (1971)
ザ・ピーナッツ・ベスト・アルバム (The Peanuts Best Album) (1971)
華麗なるフランシス・レイ・サウンド ザ･ピーナッツ最新映画主題歌を歌う (Brilliant Frances Ray Sound – The Peanuts Sing the Latest Movie Theme Song) (1971)
世界の女たち (Women in the world) (1972)
スーパーディスク 20 Superdisc 20 (1972)
ザ・ピーナッツ・オン・ステージ (The Peanuts On Stage) (1972)
ザ・ピーナッツ・ベスト２０／指輪のあとに (The Peanuts Best 20/After the Ring) (1973)
情熱の砂漠 (Passion Desert) (1973)
スーパーディスク 20 (Superdisc 20) (1973)
気になる噂／ベスト・オブ・ザ・ピーナッツ (ki ni naru uwasa/Best Of The Peanuts) (1974)
ザ・ピーナッツベスト２０ (The Peanuts Best 20) (1974)
永遠の (Eternal!) (1975)
ザ・ピーナッツ・ベスト２０ (The Peanuts – Best 20) (1975)
 ザ・ピーナッツ (Big Star Series – The Peanuts) (1976)
 ザ・ピーナッツ (Big Star W Series  – The Peanuts) (1977)
ピーナッツオリジナル (The Peanuts Original) (1978)
ピーナッツポップス (The Peanuts Pops) (1978)
ピーナッツラブ (The Peanuts Love) (1978)
ベストスターWデラックス (Best Star W Deluxe) (1979)
スーパースター・ベスト・アルバム ザ・ピーナッツ (Super Star Best Album – The Peanuts) (1979)
記念碑 (Monument) (1980)
ザ・ピーナッツ・ベスト (The Peanuts Best) (1980)
ピーナッツの歴史第一巻 (The Peanuts History Vol. 1) (1983)
ピーナッツの歴史2巻 (The Peanuts History Vol. 2) (1983)
ザ・ピーナッツ・ベスト (The Peanuts Best) (1984)
ザ・ピーナッツ・オン・ステージ (The Peanuts On Stage) (1984)
ザ・ピーナッツ・ベスト・アルバム (The Peanuts Best Album) (1985)
Ｄ.Ｃ.恋のフーガ (D.C. koi no fuuga) (1987)
Ｄ.Ｃ. (Retro) (1988)

Kōhaku Uta Gassen appearances

References

Sources

External links 
 Nippop Profile | The Peanuts
 Extensive discography 

Japanese girl groups
Japanese pop music groups
Musicians from Aichi Prefecture
Musical groups established in 1958
Musical groups from Aichi Prefecture
Twin musical duos
Female musical duos
Identical twin females
1941 births
2012 deaths
2016 deaths
Japanese vocal groups
Musical groups disestablished in 1975
1958 establishments in Japan
Japanese musical duos
Pop music duos